Nuulua is an island in Samoa (not to be confused with the landmass also called Nuulua that lies 200 meters west of Ofu in American Samoa). It is located in the Aleipata Islands, somewhat more than 1.3 km from the eastern end of Upolu (a much larger island that is also part of Samoa).

Nuulua has a land area of 25 hectares. It is a habitat for locally and regionally endemic birds, including the endangered tooth-billed pigeon (Didunculus strigirostris), also known as the Samoan pigeon, and also for an endemic bat (Pteropus samoensis).

Nuulua and Nu'utele, another island in the Aleipata Islands grouping, are together home to the largest seabird colonies in Samoa, and have been identified as highly significant sites for conservation efforts. One of the efforts is to eradicate these islands’ populations of Pacific rats (Rattus exulans) that prey on their native insects, birds and lizards.

These islands are remnants of eroded volcanic tuff rings.

In keeping with local custom, both islands are owned ex officio by the holders of certain chiefly titles in the villages of Aleipata on Upolu Island.

See also

 Samoa Islands
 List of islands
 Desert island

References

Uninhabited islands of Samoa
Nature conservation in Samoa
Biota of Samoa
Atua (district)